Watertown Carhouse is a bus maintenance facility and former streetcar carhouse located in the southern section of Watertown, Massachusetts, across the Charles River from Watertown Square. As Watertown Yard, the site also serves as a bus depot serving local and express routes, with additional connections available at Watertown Square on the opposite end of the Watertown Bridge.

History

In 1900, streetcar service was extended south from Watertown Square to Newton Corner, which served as a transfer point between the Boston Elevated Railway (BERy) and suburban operators. In 1912, the Watertown Line was created by extending the Newton Corner line along these tracks to a new transfer facility, yard, and maintenance facility, Watertown Yard.

Watertown Yard formerly served as the terminus of the Green Line A branch, with its heavy maintenance shops eventually handling most work for the remaining trolley routes by the 1950s. When the D branch opened in 1959, the Riverside shops were opened to supplement the Watertown and Reservoir carhouses. Due to a rolling stock shortage created largely by the opening of the D branch, as well as traffic problems at the poorly designed Newton Corner rotary, the A branch was closed in 1969 and replaced by the #57 bus. However, Watertown Carhouse continued to see frequent use.

The Bennett Street Carhouse near Harvard Square was closed in the 1970s for construction of the Harvard Kennedy School. On February 22, 1974, the MBTA began conversion of Watertown Carhouse to a trolleybus and streetcar maintenance facility to replace Bennett.

During the 1970s and 1980s, the line was kept open for maintenance moves to the carhouse at night. After the newly arrived Boeing LRVs began failing in the late 1970s, the MBTA was desperate for functional rolling stock. At Watertown, 15 out-of-service and wrecked PCC streetcars were rebuilt to as-new condition. (Ten of these cars still run on the Ashmont–Mattapan High Speed Line). Crews at the carhouse rebuilt trolleybuses serving the Harvard lines, converted other PCC cars into work cars, and salvaged trucks from pre-1924 Blue Line stock to build new work cars. LRVs and even the still-in-use Type 7 cars were brought in for maintenance work, using LRVs equipped with trolley poles to tow the modern pantograph-equipped cars under the older trolley wire.

By the time the tracks to Watertown were removed in 1994, Watertown served primarily as the Green Line's scrapyard.  Several wrecked cars, including sections of cars 3648 and 3639 wrecked at Copley in 1989, remained in the carhouse until they were scrapped in 2012. Tracks remain in the yard and in the carhouse itself.

Watertown Carhouse is now primarily used as a midday layover for buses, as a crew base, and for light maintenance work. Until January 2006, it was used for servicing, storage, and testing of new dual-mode buses and trolleybuses for the Silver Line Phase 2 BRT sets, which were tested under the wires used by the #71.

Bus routes
A widened sidewalk with two bus shelters on the north side of the site serves as the boarding area at Watertown Yard. Buses entering the yard, especially those going out of service, may drop off passengers at the entrance to the yard. Three local MBTA bus routes, two express routes, and a limited-service route stop at Watertown Yard; all terminate there except for the #59. As a rapid transit replacement service, the #57 is the most frequent and most heavily ridden of the routes. 
: Dedham Mall–Watertown Yard
: Watertown Yard–
: –Watertown Square
: Watertown Yard–Copley station
: Watertown Yard–Federal Street & Franklin Street

The  Watertown Yard– route also operates a single early-morning trip.

References

External links

MBTA – Watertown Yard

Buildings and structures in Watertown, Massachusetts
Bus stations in Middlesex County, Massachusetts
Green Line (MBTA) stations
Railway stations in Middlesex County, Massachusetts
Former MBTA stations in Massachusetts
Railway stations closed in 1969